is a Japanese politician of the Liberal Democratic Party, a member of the House of Representatives in the Diet (national legislature).

Background and profile
A native of Uwajima, Ehime and graduate of Keio University, Yamamoto is the son of Yuichi Yamamoto, the mayor of Uwajima, and a member of the House of Representatives.

Yamamoto was elected to his one term in the assembly of Aichi Prefecture in 1991 and to the House of Representatives for the first time in 1993.

His profile on the LDP website:
Member, Ehime Prefectural Assembly
Parliamentary Vice-Minister of Environment(Hashimoto Cabinet)
Senior Vice-Minister for Internal Affairs and Communications(Koizumi Cabinet)
Deputy Chairman, General Council of LDP
Director, Land, Infrastructure and Transport Division of LDP
Chairman, Fundamental National Policies Committee of Diet

Positions
Affiliated to the openly revisionist lobby Nippon Kaigi, Yamamoto gave the following answers to the questionnaire submitted by Mainichi to parliamentarians in 2012:
in favor of the revision of the Constitution
in favor of right of collective self-defense (revision of Article 9)
in favor of reactivating nuclear power plants
against the goal of zero nuclear power by 2030s
in favor of the relocation of Marine Corps Air Station Futenma (Okinawa)
in favor of evaluating the purchase of Senkaku Islands by the Government
in favor of an attitude avoiding conflict with China
against the participation of Japan to the Trans-Pacific Partnership
against a nuclear-armed Japan
no answer regarding the reform of the National assembly (unicameral instead of bicameral)
no answer regarding the reform of the Imperial Household that would allow women to retain their Imperial status even after marriage

References

External links
 Official website in Japanese.

Living people
1947 births
People from Uwajima, Ehime
Members of Nippon Kaigi
Liberal Democratic Party (Japan) politicians
Members of the House of Representatives (Japan)
21st-century Japanese politicians
Environment ministers of Japan